Unione Sportiva Livorno 1915 (formerly A.S. Livorno Calcio, commonly known as Livorno), is a semi-professional Italian football club based in Livorno, Tuscany. They compete in Serie D, the top tier of semi-professional Italian football after their promotion from the regional Eccellenza Tuscany league. The team's colours are dark red ( in Italian, from which the team nickname derives). Livorno were one of the original sides of Serie A, but since the 1950s have been mostly outside of the top flight due to two club refoundings in 1991 and 2021, which necessitated a start from the Eccellenza. Their best placement in Italian Serie A was second place in 1942–43 season, during which the  gave life to a head-to-head competition with Torino. US Livorno play their home matches at the Stadio Armando Picchi.

History

Founded 15 February 1915 as A.S. Livorno Calcio, the club ended the Italian Football Championship 1919–20 in second place, losing the final to Internazionale. One year later, they were defeated in the semi-final by arch-rivals Pisa. In 1933, the club moved to the current stadium, originally named after Edda Ciano Mussolini, daughter of fascist dictator Benito Mussolini. Livorno was one of the original Serie A teams. They played in top level during periods of 1929–31, 1933–35 and 1937–39. Successively, Livorno ended as Serie A runners-up in the 1942–43 season. Livorno left Serie A in 1949 after seven consecutive seasons. They were relegated to Serie C soon after (1951–52 season), making a return to Serie B in 1955 for a single season and again from 1964 to 1972. They relegated to Serie C2 in 1982–83 and played again in third level between 1984 and 1989. The club was then cancelled in 1991, being forced to start from Eccellenza; two consecutive promotions led the team back to Serie C2. The club was promoted to Serie C1 in 1997 and was acquired by Aldo Spinelli two years later. Under the new property, Livorno returned to Serie B in 2001.

Livorno were promoted to Serie A after finishing third in the Serie B 2003–04, one of six clubs to be promoted that season. It had been 55 years since Livorno's last season in the top flight, and as a result of this, most were predicting an instant return to Serie B for the club. The first match in the major league was attended by Italian President Carlo Azeglio Ciampi, a Livorno's citizen and team supporter in his childhood. There were spells of struggle during the season, but there were many more good performances shown, and Livorno finished a surprise and creditable ninth place in the league for the Serie A 2004–05, also thanks to goals by striker Cristiano Lucarelli, who won the Serie A top scorer award that season, outscoring even the likes of Andriy Shevchenko and Adriano.

The Serie A 2005–06 saw Livorno in sixth place after the first half of the season the team, being involved for qualification to the next UEFA Cup. Shortly after, Roberto Donadoni announced his resignations after having been criticised by club's chairman Aldo Spinelli. Donadoni was replaced by veteran coach Carlo Mazzone, who was only able to save a UEFA Cup place due to the expulsion of three teams from Europe in the Calciopoli scandal. Mazzone then saw his team suffer a run of seven straight defeats. In May 2006, Daniele Arrigoni was appointed new coach for the next season.

In the Serie A 2006–07 season, Livorno took part to the UEFA Cup for their first time ever. The Tuscan side were drawn to face Austrian team SV Pasching in the first round, beating them comfortably 3–0 on aggregate. They thus qualified for the group stages being drawn in Group A, along with Rangers, Auxerre, FK Partizan, and Maccabi Haifa. After a home loss to Rangers (2–3) and two 1–1 draws against Partizan in Belgrade (where goalkeeper Marco Amelia scored in the 87th minute) and Maccabi (in Livorno), the Tuscan side gained a 1–0 victory over Auxerre in the last game played in France, thus earning a spot in the Round of 32 of the competition. However, Spanish team Espanyol knocked out Livorno from the UEFA Cup by winning 4–1 on aggregate.

After day 19 of the Italian Serie A, Arrigoni was sacked by chairman Spinelli, but his position was kept due to the strong opposition by the team. His dismissal was, however, only delayed, as Arrigoni was eventually fired on 21 March 2007, and replaced by Fernando Orsi, who managed to keep the team away from the relegation battle. For the 2007–08 campaign, Orsi was confirmed as head coach and a number of notable signings such as Francesco Tavano, Diego Tristan and Vikash Dhorasoo were finalised, but also the transfer of Lucarelli to Ukrainian club Shakhtar Donetsk. The club, however, did not start well, making a mere two points in the first seven matches, and Orsi was sacked on 9 October and replaced by Giancarlo Camolese. Despite showing some positive signals at the beginning, Livorno found himself again at the bottom of league table. On 28 April 2008, Camolese was fired as Orsi was re-appointed, but in the penultimate day of the season, the team could not avoid relegation, due to a 1–0 home defeat against Torino. They finished last in the Serie A standings of the 2007–08 season. Thus, being relegated to Serie B. They finished Serie B as the third place team in 2008–09 season and returned to Serie A after winning promotion play-offs after defeating successively Grosseto with a 4–3 aggregate score and Brescia with a 5–2 aggregate score. However, this return was short-lived and one season later they relegated again to Serie B after finishing last. Livorno were promoted again after they beat Empoli 2–1 on aggregate to get the Serie A promotion.

In 2014, Livorno relegated back to Serie B again. The club also sold flagship striker Paulinho for €8 million fee, in order to cover the net loss. In 2016 Livorno relegated again to Lega Pro, but two years later the team managed to bounce back to Serie B.

In the 2019–20 season of Serie B, Livorno ended up last, leading them to be relegated to Serie C. In the 2020–21 Serie C season, Livorno finished in last place with 29 points following a five-point deduction due to failure to pay player wages on time, and was relegated to Serie D. However, due to the club's bankruptcy, they could not pay the admission fee for Serie D and were reformed in the Eccellenza under the new denomination of Unione Sportiva Livorno 1915 and the ownership of former Prato chairman Paolo Toccafondi. In the 2021-22 season, Livorno finished first in Group B of the Eccellenza Toscana, but were narrowly defeated in the national playoffs by S.S.D. Pomezia Calcio. However, Livorno were later admitted back to Serie D in place of Figline, who were barred from promotion after throwing a game against Tau Calcio Altopascio which influenced the promotion tournament seeding.

Coaching staff

Players

Current squad

Managers

Jack Kirwan (1923–24)
Karl Stürmer (1934–36)
József Viola (1940–41)
Hermann Felsner (1948–50)
Mario Magnozzi (1954–56)
Arturo Silvestri (1959–61)
Carlo Parola (1964–65)
Aldo Puccinelli (1969–70)
Armando Picchi (1969–70)
Costanzo Balleri (1970–72)
Giovan Battista Fabbri (1973–74)
Aldo Puccinelli (1975)
Francisco Lojacono (1975–76)
Tarcisio Burgnich (1978–80)
Idilio Cei (1981–82)
Costanzo Balleri (1982–83)
Giuliano Zoratti (1992–94)
Giuseppe Papadopulo (1 July 1995 – 30 June 1996)
Paolo Stringara (1996–98)
Simone Boldini (30 December 1998–99)
Pietro Carmignani (1999–00)
Osvaldo Jaconi (1 July 2000 – 30 June 2002)
Roberto Donadoni (1 July 2002 – 30 June 2003)
Walter Mazzarri (1 July 2003 – 30 June 2004)
Franco Colomba (1 July 2004 – 11 January 2005)
Roberto Donadoni (11 January 2005 – 6 February 2006)
Carlo Mazzone (7 February 2006 – 30 June 2006)
Daniele Arrigoni (1 July 2006 – 14 January 2007)

Fernando Orsi (20 March 2007 – 10 October 2007)
Giancarlo Camolese (10 October 2007 – 28 April 2008)
Leonardo Acori (4 June 2008 – 23 May 2009)
Gennaro Ruotolo (23 May 2009 – 20 October 2009)
Serse Cosmi (21 October 2009 – 25 January 2010)
Gennaro Ruotolo (2010)
Giuseppe Pillon (30 June 2010 – 12 February 2011)
Walter Novellino (12 February 2011 – 21 December 2011)
Armando Madonna (22 December 2011 – 6 May 2012)
Attilio Perotti (6 May 2012 – 6 June 2012)
Davide Nicola (6 June 2012 – 13 January 2014)
Attilio Perotti (13 January 2014 – 21 January 2014)
Domenico Di Carlo (21 January 2014 – 21 April 2014)
Davide Nicola (21 April 2014 – 30 June 2014)
Carmine Gautieri (4 July 2014 – 4 January 2015)
Ezio Gelain (4 January 2015 – 18 March 2015)
Christian Panucci (18 March 2015 – 25 November 2015)
Bortolo Mutti (25 November 2015 – 27 January 2016)
Christian Panucci (27 January 2016 – 21 March 2016)
Franco Colomba (21 March 2016 – 16 April 2016)
Ezio Gelain (16 April 2016 – 2020)
Marco Amelia (2020-2021)
Giuseppe Angelini (2022-)

Supporters

Livorno's supporters are well known for their left-wing politics which often spark fiercely violent clashes with opposing right-wing supporter groups, especially those of Lazio and Verona. Former Lazio striker Paolo Di Canio once made a Roman salute to his own fans during a match against Livorno, when tensions were running high between the two clubs' ultra groups.

Since 2005, a group of migrant Livorno supporters resident in northern Europe have styled themselves . A so-called "triangle of brotherhood" has developed between the most heavily supported left-wing fan clubs of Marseille, Livorno, and AEK Athens, namely between Commando Ultras 84, Brigate Autonome Livornesi 99, and Original 21. Their connection is mostly an ideological one. They also have a connection with Adana Demirspor (Şimşekler) and Celtic.

In Europe

UEFA Cup

Honours
Serie A
Runners-up (2): 1919–20, 1942–43
Serie B
Winners (2): 1932–33, 1936–37
Runners-up (1): 1939–40
Other Promotions (3): 2003–04, 2008–09, 2012–13
Serie C/Serie C1/Lega Pro
Winners (3): 1963–64, 2001–02, 2017–18
Promotions (5): 1954–55, 1959–60, 1963–64, 2001–02, 2017–18
Serie C2/Lega Pro Seconda Divisione
Winners (1): 1983–84
Runners-up (1): 1995–96, 1996–97
Promotions (2): 1983–84, 1996–97
Coppa Italia Serie C/Coppa Italia Lega Pro
Winners (1): 1986–87
Runners-up (1): 2001-02

Divisional movements

References

External links

  

 
Football clubs in Tuscany
Association football clubs established in 1915
Italian football First Division clubs
Serie A clubs
Serie B clubs
Serie C clubs
Serie D clubs
Eccellenza
1915 establishments in Italy
Phoenix clubs (association football)
1991 establishments in Italy
2021 establishments in Italy
Coppa Italia Serie C winning clubs